Mannsville is a town in Johnston County, Oklahoma, United States. The population was 863 at the 2010 census, up from 587 in 2000.

Geography
Mannsville is located in southwestern Johnston County at  (34.185707, -96.880271). It is bordered to the west by the town of Dickson in Carter County. , or 0.73% of the town's area, are water bodies.

U.S. Route 177 passes through the center of Mannsville, leading west  to the center of Dickson and southeast  to Madill.

Mannsville has an all-volunteer fire department three stations, two in town and one in the small community of Greasy Bend.

Demographics

As of the census of 2000, there were 587 people, 221 households, and 150 families residing in the town. There were 253 housing units at an average density of 234.4 per square mile (90.4/km2). The racial makeup of the town was 81.77% White, 0.17% African American, 9.88% Native American, 0.34% from other races, and 7.84% from two or more races. Hispanic or Latino of any race were 0.51% of the population.

There were 221 households, out of which 33.0% had children under the age of 18 living with them, 51.1% were married couples living together, 13.1% had a female householder with no husband present, and 31.7% were non-families. 25.3% of all households were made up of individuals, and 10.0% had someone living alone who was 65 years of age or older. The average household size was 2.66 and the average family size was 3.25.

In the town, the population was spread out, with 26.6% under the age of 18, 8.3% from 18 to 24, 31.2% from 25 to 44, 21.6% from 45 to 64, and 12.3% who were 65 years of age or older. The median age was 36 years. For every 100 females, there were 100.3 males. For every 100 females age 18 and over, there were 95.0 males.

The median income for a household in the town was $24,896, and the median income for a family was $30,982. Males had a median income of $21,838 versus $18,676 for females. The per capita income for the town was $10,683. About 16.0% of families and 20.1% of the population were below the poverty line, including 24.9% of those under age 18 and 17.3% of those age 65 or over.

References

Towns in Johnston County, Oklahoma
Towns in Oklahoma